Koetong was a closed station located in the town of Koetong, on the Cudgewa railway line in Victoria, Australia. Today there is nothing left of the station.

The passenger platform was shortened from 33.5m to 15m in 1976, before closing altogether on 30 April of the same year.

References

Disused railway stations in Victoria (Australia)
Shire of Towong